Marian Smoluchowski (28 May 1872  – 5 September 1917) was a  Polish physicist who worked in the Polish territories of the Austro-Hungarian Empire. He was a pioneer of statistical physics, and an avid mountaineer.

Life
Born into an upper-class family in Vorder-Brühl, near Vienna, Smoluchowski studied physics at the University of Vienna. His teachers included Franz S. Exner and Joseph Stefan.  Ludwig Boltzmann held a position at Munich University during Smoluchowski's studies in Vienna, and Boltzmann returned to Vienna in 1894 when Smoluchowski was serving in the Austrian army. They apparently had no direct contact, although Smoluchowski's work follows in the tradition of Boltzmann's ideas.

After several years at other universities (Paris, Glasgow, Berlin), in 1899 Smoluchowski moved to Lwów (present-day Lviv), where he took a position at the University of Lwów. He was president of the Polish Copernicus Society of Naturalists, 1906–7.

In 1913 Smoluchowski moved to Kraków to take over a chair in the Experimental Physics Department, succeeding August Witkowski, who had long envisioned Smoluchowski as his successor.  When World War I began the following year, the work conditions became unusually difficult, as the spacious and modern Physics Department building, built by Witkowski a short time before, was turned into a military hospital. The possibility of working in that building had been one of the reasons Smoluchowski had decided to move to Kraków.  Smoluchowski was now forced to work in the apartment of the late Professor Karol Olszewski.  During his lectures in experimental physics, use of even the simplest demonstration equipment was virtually impossible.

Smoluchowski was a member of the Copernicus Society of Natural Scientists and the Polish Academy of Sciences and Letters.

His non-professional interests included skiing, mountain climbing in the Alps and the Tatra Mountains, watercolor painting, and playing the piano.
      
Smoluchowski died in Kraków in 1917, victim of a dysentery epidemic. Professor Władysław Natanson wrote in an obituary of Smoluchowski: "With great pleasure I recall the charm of his life, his noble cordiality, combined with exquisite kindness.  I wish I could render the curious appeal of his personality, recall how temperate he was, how modest and elegantly diffident, yet always full of a pure, spontaneous joy."

In 1901 he had married Zofia Baraniecka, who survived him.  They had two children, Aldona Smoluchowska (1902–84) and Roman Smoluchowski (1910-96). Roman became a notable physicist who worked in Poland, and after World War II settled in the United States (the Institute for Advanced Study at Princeton).

Work
Smoluchowski conducted fundamental research on the kinetic theory of matter. In 1904 he discovered density fluctuations in the gas phase, and in 1908 he was the first physicist to ascribe the phenomenon of critical opalescence to large density fluctuations.  His investigations explained the blue color of the sky as a consequence of light scattering in the atmosphere.

In 1906, shortly after Albert Einstein, he independently explained  Brownian motion.
Smoluchowski presented an equation which became a basis for the theory of stochastic processes.

In 1916 he proposed the equation for diffusion in an external potential field. This equation bears his name.

See also
Critical opalescence
Electrophoresis
List of Poles (physicists)
Marian Smoluchowski Medal

Notes

Literature
 A. Teske, Marian Smoluchowski, Leben und Werk. Polish Academy of Sciences, Warsaw, 1977.
 A. Einstein and M. von Smoluchowski: "Untersuchungen über die Theorie der Brownschen Bewegung. Abhandlung über die Brownsche Bewegung und verwandte Erscheinungen", Harri Deutsch, 1997. (Ostwalds Klassiker der exakten Wissenschaften Band 199).  .
 S. Chandrasekhar, M. Kac, R. Smoluchowski, "Marian Smoluchowski - his life and scientific work", ed. by R.S. Ingarden, PWN, Warszawa 1999.
 E. Seneta (2001) Marian Smoluchowski, Statisticians of the Centuries (ed. C. C. Heyde and E. Seneta) pp. 299–302. New York: Springer.
 S. Ulam (1957) Marian Smoluchowski and the Theory of Probabilities in Physics, American Journal of Physics, 25, 475-481  (ISSN 0002-9505).
 Abraham Pais, Subtle is the Lord, chapter 5, section 5e. Einstein and Smoluchowski; Critical Opalescence, (pp. 100–103), Oxford University Press, (1982) 2005, .

External links 
 umcs.lublin.pl Chronological Table of Marian Smoluchowski's Life,  (Retrieved 13 April 2010)
 M. Smoluchowski's Writings in 3 Volumes (papers as pdf files) (Retrieved 13 April 2010)
 
 A. Fuliński: On Marian Smoluchowski's life and contribution to physics pdf file, Acta Phys. Polonica B, Vol. 29 (1998), No 6, pp. 1523–1537 (Retrieved 13 April 2010)
 internet version of Wielka Encyklopedia Tatrzańska, entry Marian Smoluchowski (as a mountaineer), after Zofia i Witold H. Paryscy, Wielka Encyklopedia Tatrzańska, 1995, 2004,  (Retrieved 13 April 2010)

1872 births
1917 deaths
20th-century Polish physicists
Polish mountain climbers
Scientists from Vienna
Austrian knights
Burials at Rakowicki Cemetery
Polish Austro-Hungarians
People from Mödling
Deaths from dysentery
Infectious disease deaths in Poland
Academic staff of Jagiellonian University
Academic staff of the University of Lviv